The following is the standings of the 2009–10 2nd Division football season. This is the 3rd rated football competition in Iran after the Azadegan League and Persian Gulf Cup.

It will be divided into two phases: the regular season, played from October 2010 to March 2011, and the Second round from March to June 2011.

The league will also be composed of 32 teams divided into two divisions of 16 teams each, whose teams will be divided geographically.  Teams will play only other teams in their own division, once at home and once away for a total of 30 matches each.

In each division, two teams are promoted to Azadegan League, and four teams are relegated to  3rd Division and plus one relegation playoff losers from each division will be relegated to 3rd Division. In total, the league promotes 4 teams to Azadegan League and relegates 10 teams to 3rd Division.

Teams

Group A

Group B

League standings and results

Group A

Group B

Final League standing

Championship final
The first leg to be played on 27 May 2011; the return leg to be played on 2 June 2011

Third place play-off
The single match to be played on 26 May 2011

Relegation play-off
The first legs to be played on 13 June 2011; the return legs to be played on 19 June 2011

(R)Shahrdari Bandar Anzali Relegated to 3rd Division.

(R)Baam Shahrekord Relegated to 3rd Division.

Player statistics

Top scorers

References

Sources

 1st Week
 2nd Week
 3rd Week
 4th Week
 5th Week
 6th Week
 7th Week
 8th Week
 9th Week
 10th Week
 11th Week
 12th Week

League 2 (Iran) seasons
3